Digitivalva luteola is a moth of the family Acrolepiidae. It is found in Tanzania.

References

Acrolepiidae
Moths described in 1988